Zahirović  is a Bosnian surname (meaning "son of Zahir"). Notable people with the surname include:

Adnan Zahirović (born 1990), Bosnian footballer
Emsad Zahirovic (born 1988), Bosnia-born American footballer
Haris Zahirovic (born 2003), Bosnian footballer
Ševal Zahirović (born 1972), Bosnian footballer

Bosnian surnames
Patronymic surnames
Surnames from given names